Eremophila spectabilis, commonly known as showy poverty bush, is a flowering plant in the figwort family, Scrophulariaceae and is endemic to Western Australia. It is a dense, erect shrub with narrow, greyish leaves and blue, mauve or purple flowers.

Description
The branches are densely hairy but the hairs are often hidden by the resin.

The petal tube is mauve, purple or violet. The outside of the petal tube and lobes is hairy and often sticky, the inside surface of the lobes is glabrous and the inside of the tube is hairy. The 4 stamens are enclosed in the petal tube. Flowering time is from June to October.

Taxonomy and naming 
The species was first formally described by Charles Gardner in 1942 and the description was published in Journal of the Royal Society of Western Australia. The specific epithet (spectabilis) is a Latin word meaning "notable", "admirable" or "remarkable".

There are two subspecies:

Distribution and habitat
Subspecies spectabilis grows in sandy or clay soils near Meekatharra in the Gascoyne and Murchison biogeographic regions.

Subspecies brevis is common in sandy or loam soils between Meekatharra and Leinster in the Gascoyne and Murchison biogeographic regions.

Conservation
Both subspecies of showy poverty bush are classified as "not threatened" by the Western Australian Government Department of Parks and Wildlife.

Use in horticulture
Showy poverty bush deserves its name - it is a very attractive shrub with brightly coloured, well-displayed flowers. It can be propagated with difficulty from cuttings but more easily by grafting onto Myoporum rootstock. It prefers well drained soil in full sun or part shade but only needs occasional watering during a long dry spell. It needs to be protected from frosts but will respond to a light pruning to remove damaged stems.

References

Eudicots of Western Australia
spectabilis
Endemic flora of Western Australia
Plants described in 1942
Taxa named by Charles Gardner